Stephen King is an American author of contemporary horror, supernatural fiction, suspense, science fiction, crime fiction, and fantasy. His books have sold more than 350 million copies, many of which have been adapted into feature films, miniseries, television shows, and comic books. King has published 61 novels, including seven under the pen name Richard Bachman, and five non-fiction books. He has written approximately 200 short stories, most of which have been compiled in book collections.

King has received multiple awards and nominations for his work, including multiple Bram Stoker Awards, World Fantasy Awards, and British Fantasy Society Awards, as well as the National Medal of Arts, Medal for Distinguished Contribution to American Letters, and the O. Henry Award.  He has also received awards for his contribution to literature for his entire oeuvre, such as the World Fantasy Award for Life Achievement (2004), the Canadian Booksellers Association Lifetime Achievement Award (2007), and the Grand Master Award from the Mystery Writers of America (2007).

Awards and nominations

Career and lifetime achievement awards

Works

References

External links
 Partial list of awards and nominations on Stephen King's website
 Official site of the Bram Stoker Awards
 Official site of the World Fantasy Awards
 Comprehensive listing of all Locus Award winners and nominees
 Official site of the Edgar Awards
Stephen King Awards at The Science Fiction Awards Database

Awards and nominations received by
King, Stephen, list of awards and nominations received by